Raquel Elizabeth Miller (born February 15, 1985) is an American professional boxer who has held the WBA interim female super welterweight title since 2019.

Professional career
Miller made her professional debut on May 21, 2016, scoring a first-round technical knockout (TKO) over Sara Flores at the Richmond Memorial Auditorium in Richmond, California.

Professional boxing record

References

Living people
1985 births
American women boxers
Boxers from San Francisco
Light-middleweight boxers
Middleweight boxers
African-American boxers
21st-century African-American sportspeople
20th-century African-American people
20th-century African-American women
21st-century African-American women